Popovca may refer to several places in Moldova:

Popovca, a village in Lingura Commune, Cantemir district
Popovca, a village in Natalievca Commune, Făleşti district